T. maximus  may refer to:
 Thalasseus maximus, the royal tern, a seabird species that breeds on the Atlantic and Pacific coasts of the southern USA and Mexico into the Caribbean
 Tylenchorhynchus maximus, a plant pathogenic nematode species

See also
 Maximus (disambiguation)